Massimo Ghini (born 12 October 1954) is an Italian actor.

Life
He has worked with Franco Zeffirelli, Giorgio Strehler, Giuseppe Patroni Griffi, and Gabriele Lavia, among others.  

He has been married to actress Nancy Brilli, and is the father of four children.

Selected filmography

Film
 Speed Cross (1980)
 La neve nel bicchiere (1984)
 Secrets Secrets (1984)
 Lethal Obsession (1987)
 Compagni di scuola (1988)
 Italia-Germania 4-3 (1990)
 The Battle of the Three Kings (1990)
 Red American (1991)
 The Party's Over (1991)
 Una storia semplice (1991)
 La bella vita (1994)
 The True Life of Antonio H. (1994)
 Men Men Men (1995)
 State Secret (1995)
 Celluloide (1996)
 Follow Your Heart (1996)
 The Truce (1997)
 The Game Bag (1997)
 Tea with Mussolini (1999)
 CQ (2001)
 Almost America (2001)
 John XXIII: The Pope of Peace (2002)
 Imperium: Augustus (2003)
 Floor 17 (2005)
 Natale a Miami (2005)
 Natale a New York (2006)
 Tutta la vita davanti (2008)
 Natale a Rio (2008)
 Natale a Beverly Hills (2009)
 Natale in Sudafrica (2010)
 Amici miei – Come tutto ebbe inizio (2011)
 Vacanze ai Caraibi (2015)
 Non si ruba a casa dei ladri (2016)
 There's No Place Like Home (2018)
 L'agenzia dei bugiardi (2019)
 De sable et de feu (2019)
 Vivere (2019)
 La mia banda suona il pop (2020)

Television
 Raccontami (2006 - 2008)
Titanic: Blood and Steel (2012)
The New Pope (2020)

References

External links 

 

1954 births
Living people
Italian male television actors
Italian male film actors
Male actors from Rome
Ciak d'oro winners
Nastro d'Argento winners